Hassan Shemshaki (born 22 May 1974) is an Iranian alpine skier. He competed in the men's slalom at the 1998 Winter Olympics.

References

External links
 

1974 births
Living people
Iranian male alpine skiers
Olympic alpine skiers of Iran
Alpine skiers at the 1998 Winter Olympics
Sportspeople from Tehran
Alpine skiers at the 1996 Asian Winter Games